Antonin Rolland (born 3 September 1924) is a French former professional cyclist who was active from 1946 to 1963. Rolland won stages in the Tour de France and in the Giro d'Italia. He was born in Sainte-Euphémie, Ain.

In the 1955 Tour de France, Rolland led the general classification for twelve stages, but his team captain Louison Bobet wanted to win his third consecutive Tour, so did not help Rolland to defend the lead. Rolland ended in fifth place that year, his best Tour de France result in his career.

Major results

1946
GP de Thizy
1948
Chauffailles
1950
Grand prix du Midi Libre
1951
Bourg-Geneva-Bourg
1952
Tour de France:
Winner stage 23
1953
Cazès-Mondenard
Nantua
Tour de France:
7th place overall classification
1955
Cluny
Bourg-Geneva-Bourg
Tour de France:
5th place overall classification
Wearing yellow jersey for 12 stages
Winner stage 2
1956
Grand prix du Midi Libre
Oyonnax
1957
GP de Cannes
Mâcon
Giro d'Italia:
Winner stages 3, 7 and 9
1958
Giro di Sardegna
1959
La Charité-sur-Loire

References

External links 

Official Tour de France results for Antonin Rolland

1924 births
Living people
Sportspeople from Ain
French male cyclists
French Tour de France stage winners
French Giro d'Italia stage winners
Cyclists from Auvergne-Rhône-Alpes